The 1911 VFL season was the 15th season of the Victorian Football League (VFL), the highest level senior Australian rules football competition in Victoria.

The season featured ten clubs, ran from 29 April until 23 September, and comprised an 18-game home-and-away season followed by a finals series featuring the top four clubs. The season was the beginning of the league's professional era, with clubs permitted for the first time to pay players beyond the reimbursement of expenses.

The premiership was won by the Essendon Football Club for the third time, after it defeated  by six points in the 1911 VFL Grand Final.

Premiership season
In 1911, the VFL competition consisted of ten teams of 18 on-the-field players each, with no "reserves", although any of the 18 players who had left the playing field for any reason could later resume their place on the field at any time during the match.

Each team played each other twice in a home-and-away season of 18 rounds.

Once the 18 round home-and-away season had finished, the 1911 VFL Premiers were determined by the specific format and conventions of the amended "Argus system".

Round 1

|- bgcolor="#CCCCFF"
| Home team
| Home team score
| Away team
| Away team score
| Venue
| Date
|- bgcolor="#FFFFFF"
| 
| 14.18 (102)
| 
| 5.10 (40)
| Lake Oval
| 29 April 1911
|- bgcolor="#FFFFFF"
| 
| 14.10 (94)
| 
| 9.11 (65)
| Victoria Park
| 29 April 1911
|- bgcolor="#FFFFFF"
| 
| 10.6 (66)
| 
| 7.15 (57)
| Junction Oval
| 29 April 1911
|- bgcolor="#FFFFFF"
| 
| 10.12 (72)
| 
| 11.4 (70)
| MCG
| 29 April 1911
|- bgcolor="#FFFFFF"
| 
| 5.15 (45)
| 
| 6.9 (45)
| EMCG
| 29 April 1911

Round 2

|- bgcolor="#CCCCFF"
| Home team
| Home team score
| Away team
| Away team score
| Venue
| Date
|- bgcolor="#FFFFFF"
| 
| 7.12 (54)
| 
| 7.12 (54)
| Corio Oval
| 6 May 1911
|- bgcolor="#FFFFFF"
| 
| 10.6 (66)
| 
| 10.6 (66)
| Princes Park
| 6 May 1911
|- bgcolor="#FFFFFF"
| 
| 10.9 (69)
| 
| 6.7 (43)
| MCG
| 6 May 1911
|- bgcolor="#FFFFFF"
| 
| 3.11 (29)
| 
| 10.16 (76)
| Punt Road Oval
| 6 May 1911
|- bgcolor="#FFFFFF"
| 
| 4.10 (34)
| 
| 7.7 (49)
| Brunswick Street Oval
| 6 May 1911

Round 3

|- bgcolor="#CCCCFF"
| Home team
| Home team score
| Away team
| Away team score
| Venue
| Date
|- bgcolor="#FFFFFF"
| 
| 2.5 (17)
| 
| 10.13 (73)
| Junction Oval
| 13 May 1911
|- bgcolor="#FFFFFF"
| 
| 6.17 (53)
| 
| 6.5 (41)
| Punt Road Oval
| 13 May 1911
|- bgcolor="#FFFFFF"
| 
| 8.17 (65)
| 
| 10.8 (68)
| Victoria Park
| 13 May 1911
|- bgcolor="#FFFFFF"
| 
| 6.7 (43)
| 
| 6.9 (45)
| Princes Park
| 13 May 1911
|- bgcolor="#FFFFFF"
| 
| 0.9 (9)
| 
| 6.11 (47)
| MCG
| 13 May 1911

Round 4

|- bgcolor="#CCCCFF"
| Home team
| Home team score
| Away team
| Away team score
| Venue
| Date
|- bgcolor="#FFFFFF"
| 
| 8.12 (60)
| 
| 6.11 (47)
| Corio Oval
| 20 May 1911
|- bgcolor="#FFFFFF"
| 
| 10.24 (84)
| 
| 4.6 (30)
| Brunswick Street Oval
| 20 May 1911
|- bgcolor="#FFFFFF"
| 
| 12.13 (85)
| 
| 8.11 (59)
| Lake Oval
| 20 May 1911
|- bgcolor="#FFFFFF"
| 
| 21.12 (138)
| 
| 7.11 (53)
| EMCG
| 20 May 1911
|- bgcolor="#FFFFFF"
| 
| 6.8 (44)
| 
| 9.11 (65)
| MCG
| 20 May 1911

Round 5

|- bgcolor="#CCCCFF"
| Home team
| Home team score
| Away team
| Away team score
| Venue
| Date
|- bgcolor="#FFFFFF"
| 
| 9.15 (69)
| 
| 4.7 (31)
| MCG
| 27 May 1911
|- bgcolor="#FFFFFF"
| 
| 8.17 (65)
| 
| 4.8 (32)
| Brunswick Street Oval
| 27 May 1911
|- bgcolor="#FFFFFF"
| 
| 12.14 (86)
| 
| 6.6 (42)
| EMCG
| 27 May 1911
|- bgcolor="#FFFFFF"
| 
| 13.11 (89)
| 
| 4.15 (39)
| Princes Park
| 27 May 1911
|- bgcolor="#FFFFFF"
| 
| 4.10 (34)
| 
| 5.10 (40)
| Lake Oval
| 27 May 1911

Round 6

|- bgcolor="#CCCCFF"
| Home team
| Home team score
| Away team
| Away team score
| Venue
| Date
|- bgcolor="#FFFFFF"
| 
| 8.14 (62)
| 
| 7.12 (54)
| Punt Road Oval
| 3 June 1911
|- bgcolor="#FFFFFF"
| 
| 6.13 (49)
| 
| 5.13 (43)
| Victoria Park
| 3 June 1911
|- bgcolor="#FFFFFF"
| 
| 5.12 (42)
| 
| 10.16 (76)
| MCG
| 3 June 1911
|- bgcolor="#FFFFFF"
| 
| 6.6 (42)
| 
| 8.11 (59)
| Corio Oval
| 3 June 1911
|- bgcolor="#FFFFFF"
| 
| 5.12 (42)
| 
| 6.16 (52)
| Junction Oval
| 3 June 1911

Round 7

|- bgcolor="#CCCCFF"
| Home team
| Home team score
| Away team
| Away team score
| Venue
| Date
|- bgcolor="#FFFFFF"
| 
| 6.12 (48)
| 
| 9.15 (69)
| MCG
| 5 June 1911
|- bgcolor="#FFFFFF"
| 
| 3.5 (23)
| 
| 10.11 (71)
| Brunswick Street Oval
| 5 June 1911
|- bgcolor="#FFFFFF"
| 
| 9.10 (64)
| 
| 3.6 (24)
| EMCG
| 5 June 1911
|- bgcolor="#FFFFFF"
| 
| 10.17 (77)
| 
| 7.9 (51)
| Victoria Park
| 5 June 1911
|- bgcolor="#FFFFFF"
| 
| 7.7 (49)
| 
| 5.8 (38)
| Corio Oval
| 5 June 1911

Round 8

|- bgcolor="#CCCCFF"
| Home team
| Home team score
| Away team
| Away team score
| Venue
| Date
|- bgcolor="#FFFFFF"
| 
| 8.7 (55)
| 
| 3.2 (20)
| EMCG
| 10 June 1911
|- bgcolor="#FFFFFF"
| 
| 7.13 (55)
| 
| 2.10 (22)
| Princes Park
| 10 June 1911
|- bgcolor="#FFFFFF"
| 
| 3.8 (26)
| 
| 6.6 (42)
| Junction Oval
| 10 June 1911
|- bgcolor="#FFFFFF"
| 
| 5.9 (39)
| 
| 9.13 (67)
| MCG
| 10 June 1911
|- bgcolor="#FFFFFF"
| 
| 7.10 (52)
| 
| 5.9 (39)
| Lake Oval
| 10 June 1911

Round 9

|- bgcolor="#CCCCFF"
| Home team
| Home team score
| Away team
| Away team score
| Venue
| Date
|- bgcolor="#FFFFFF"
| 
| 10.12 (72)
| 
| 9.6 (60)
| Corio Oval
| 17 June 1911
|- bgcolor="#FFFFFF"
| 
| 12.13 (85)
| 
| 4.8 (32)
| Victoria Park
| 17 June 1911
|- bgcolor="#FFFFFF"
| 
| 4.12 (36)
| 
| 5.8 (38)
| Punt Road Oval
| 17 June 1911
|- bgcolor="#FFFFFF"
| 
| 6.8 (44)
| 
| 5.11 (41)
| Lake Oval
| 17 June 1911
|- bgcolor="#FFFFFF"
| 
| 9.2 (56)
| 
| 13.11 (89)
| MCG
| 17 June 1911

Round 10

|- bgcolor="#CCCCFF"
| Home team
| Home team score
| Away team
| Away team score
| Venue
| Date
|- bgcolor="#FFFFFF"
| 
| 8.15 (63)
| 
| 5.5 (35)
| Brunswick Street Oval
| 22 June 1911
|- bgcolor="#FFFFFF"
| 
| 4.6 (30)
| 
| 7.8 (50)
| Punt Road Oval
| 22 June 1911
|- bgcolor="#FFFFFF"
| 
| 8.7 (55)
| 
| 6.4 (40)
| Corio Oval
| 24 June 1911
|- bgcolor="#FFFFFF"
| 
| 6.16 (52)
| 
| 5.10 (40)
| Princes Park
| 24 June 1911
|- bgcolor="#FFFFFF"
| 
| 4.5 (29)
| 
| 9.13 (67)
| MCG
| 24 June 1911

Round 11

|- bgcolor="#CCCCFF"
| Home team
| Home team score
| Away team
| Away team score
| Venue
| Date
|- bgcolor="#FFFFFF"
| 
| 15.11 (101)
| 
| 6.5 (41)
| Junction Oval
| 1 July 1911
|- bgcolor="#FFFFFF"
| 
| 7.15 (57)
| 
| 7.5 (47)
| EMCG
| 1 July 1911
|- bgcolor="#FFFFFF"
| 
| 9.7 (61)
| 
| 10.12 (72)
| Victoria Park
| 1 July 1911
|- bgcolor="#FFFFFF"
| 
| 10.7 (67)
| 
| 8.7 (55)
| MCG
| 1 July 1911
|- bgcolor="#FFFFFF"
| 
| 12.8 (80)
| 
| 9.11 (65)
| Lake Oval
| 1 July 1911

Round 12

|- bgcolor="#CCCCFF"
| Home team
| Home team score
| Away team
| Away team score
| Venue
| Date
|- bgcolor="#FFFFFF"
| 
| 7.15 (57)
| 
| 6.13 (49)
| EMCG
| 8 July 1911
|- bgcolor="#FFFFFF"
| 
| 12.14 (86)
| 
| 6.13 (49)
| Lake Oval
| 8 July 1911
|- bgcolor="#FFFFFF"
| 
| 3.8 (26)
| 
| 6.10 (46)
| MCG
| 8 July 1911
|- bgcolor="#FFFFFF"
| 
| 6.7 (43)
| 
| 8.5 (53)
| Corio Oval
| 8 July 1911
|- bgcolor="#FFFFFF"
| 
| 5.13 (43)
| 
| 6.10 (46)
| Brunswick Street Oval
| 8 July 1911

Round 13

|- bgcolor="#CCCCFF"
| Home team
| Home team score
| Away team
| Away team score
| Venue
| Date
|- bgcolor="#FFFFFF"
| 
| 7.7 (49)
| 
| 9.8 (62)
| MCG
| 15 July 1911
|- bgcolor="#FFFFFF"
| 
| 2.11 (23)
| 
| 3.11 (29)
| Victoria Park
| 15 July 1911
|- bgcolor="#FFFFFF"
| 
| 9.12 (66)
| 
| 2.10 (22)
| Princes Park
| 15 July 1911
|- bgcolor="#FFFFFF"
| 
| 11.14 (80)
| 
| 8.12 (60)
| Punt Road Oval
| 15 July 1911
|- bgcolor="#FFFFFF"
| 
| 3.8 (26)
| 
| 12.12 (84)
| Junction Oval
| 15 July 1911

Round 14

|- bgcolor="#CCCCFF"
| Home team
| Home team score
| Away team
| Away team score
| Venue
| Date
|- bgcolor="#FFFFFF"
| 
| 5.6 (36)
| 
| 5.7 (37)
| Victoria Park
| 22 July 1911
|- bgcolor="#FFFFFF"
| 
| 5.9 (39)
| 
| 11.11 (77)
| Junction Oval
| 22 July 1911
|- bgcolor="#FFFFFF"
| 
| 10.14 (74)
| 
| 6.3 (39)
| Corio Oval
| 22 July 1911
|- bgcolor="#FFFFFF"
| 
| 6.6 (42)
| 
| 12.8 (80)
| MCG
| 22 July 1911
|- bgcolor="#FFFFFF"
| 
| 6.5 (41)
| 
| 11.10 (76)
| Punt Road Oval
| 22 July 1911

Round 15

|- bgcolor="#CCCCFF"
| Home team
| Home team score
| Away team
| Away team score
| Venue
| Date
|- bgcolor="#FFFFFF"
| 
| 12.14 (86)
| 
| 7.7 (49)
| Brunswick Street Oval
| 29 July 1911
|- bgcolor="#FFFFFF"
| 
| 9.7 (61)
| 
| 4.11 (35)
| EMCG
| 29 July 1911
|- bgcolor="#FFFFFF"
| 
| 18.21 (129)
| 
| 2.3 (15)
| Princes Park
| 29 July 1911
|- bgcolor="#FFFFFF"
| 
| 8.25 (73)
| 
| 5.7 (37)
| Lake Oval
| 29 July 1911
|- bgcolor="#FFFFFF"
| 
| 4.6 (30)
| 
| 6.16 (52)
| MCG
| 29 July 1911

Round 16

|- bgcolor="#CCCCFF"
| Home team
| Home team score
| Away team
| Away team score
| Venue
| Date
|- bgcolor="#FFFFFF"
| 
| 11.5 (71)
| 
| 7.9 (51)
| Princes Park
| 19 August 1911
|- bgcolor="#FFFFFF"
| 
| 7.9 (51)
| 
| 9.6 (60)
| Punt Road Oval
| 19 August 1911
|- bgcolor="#FFFFFF"
| 
| 5.6 (36)
| 
| 4.3 (27)
| Lake Oval
| 19 August 1911
|- bgcolor="#FFFFFF"
| 
| 5.8 (38)
| 
| 24.19 (163)
| Junction Oval
| 19 August 1911
|- bgcolor="#FFFFFF"
| 
| 0.9 (9)
| 
| 14.14 (98)
| MCG
| 19 August 1911

Round 17

|- bgcolor="#CCCCFF"
| Home team
| Home team score
| Away team
| Away team score
| Venue
| Date
|- bgcolor="#FFFFFF"
| 
| 17.21 (123)
| 
| 5.6 (36)
| Punt Road Oval
| 26 August 1911
|- bgcolor="#FFFFFF"
| 
| 13.13 (91)
| 
| 4.5 (29)
| MCG
| 26 August 1911
|- bgcolor="#FFFFFF"
| 
| 10.12 (72)
| 
| 10.3 (63)
| Corio Oval
| 26 August 1911
|- bgcolor="#FFFFFF"
| 
| 3.7 (25)
| 
| 6.10 (46)
| Brunswick Street Oval
| 26 August 1911
|- bgcolor="#FFFFFF"
| 
| 8.8 (56)
| 
| 4.17 (41)
| Victoria Park
| 26 August 1911

Round 18

|- bgcolor="#CCCCFF"
| Home team
| Home team score
| Away team
| Away team score
| Venue
| Date
|- bgcolor="#FFFFFF"
| 
| 8.9 (57)
| 
| 4.10 (34)
| Brunswick Street Oval
| 2 September 1911
|- bgcolor="#FFFFFF"
| 
| 9.9 (63)
| 
| 8.10 (58)
| EMCG
| 2 September 1911
|- bgcolor="#FFFFFF"
| 
| 9.8 (62)
| 
| 8.6 (54)
| Princes Park
| 2 September 1911
|- bgcolor="#FFFFFF"
| 
| 7.4 (46)
| 
| 15.17 (107)
| MCG
| 2 September 1911
|- bgcolor="#FFFFFF"
| 
| 6.8 (44)
| 
| 15.11 (101)
| Junction Oval
| 2 September 1911

Ladder

Finals

All of the 1911 finals were played at the MCG so the home team in the semi-finals and Preliminary Final is purely the higher ranked team from the ladder but in the Grand Final the home team was the team that won the Preliminary Final.

Semi-finals

|- bgcolor="#CCCCFF"
| Home team
| Score
| Away team
| Score
| Venue
| Date
|- bgcolor="#FFFFFF"
| Collingwood
| 11.11 (77)
| South Melbourne
| 6.11 (47)
| MCG
| 9 September
|- bgcolor="#FFFFFF"
| Essendon
| 9.15 (69)'| Carlton
| 6.12 (48)
| MCG
| 16 September

Grand final

Essendon defeated Collingwood 5.11 (41) to 4.11 (35), in front of a crowd of 43,905 people. (For an explanation of scoring see Australian rules football).

Awards
 The 1911 VFL Premiership team was Essendon.
 The VFL's leading goalkicker was Vin Gardiner of Carlton with 47 goals.
 University took the "wooden spoon" in 1911.

Notable events
 In May 1911, after much agitation from the majority of clubs, 12 of the 16 club delegates voted to delete Rule 29 of the VFL constitution, expressly forbidding player payments beyond expenses, which had been added in 1900. It was widely accepted that most clubs had flouted this rule and used creative methods to provide payments:  by allowing payments other than reimbursement of expenses to be made to players, this made the competition professional. 
 The dissenting clubs who remained amateur were Melbourne and University, as their clubs' laws at the time stated that any player found to be professional would be immediately expelled.
 In Round 2, Geelong 7.12 (54) controversially tied Melbourne 7.12 (54) apiece, after Bert Whittington (Geelong) took a free kick after the final bell which was touched through the goal face for a behind. Under the rules at the time, the ball should have been declared dead for no score when it was touched; however, umpire Lardie Tulloch had not heard the bell over the crowd and signalled 'all clear' as if the whole passage of play had occurred before the bell. Melbourne lodged a protest against the result, but it was dismissed under a clause which had been newly added to the Laws of the Game prior to the 1911 season to provide clarity in exactly this type of situation, stating "the field umpire shall be the sole judge as to the first sound of the bell," irrespective of the volume of the bell or conduct of the timekeepers.
 In Round 4, Essendon became the first team to score 100 points against Collingwood, which was the last club remaining to have not yet conceded 100 points in a game. Essendon's score of 21.12 (138) was the highest by any club since Round 17, 1901.
 On 20 August, the SAFL Interstate team defeated Victoria 11.11 (77) to 5.4 (34) to win the 1911 Adelaide Carnival.
 In round 9, Fitzroy back-man Bill Marchbanks, a constable with the Victorian Police Force, was refused leave to play for Fitzroy against Richmond and was instead, assigned to the South Melbourne and Essendon match to patrol as a mounted policeman. Near the end of the match, the home crowd roared as South Melbourne suddenly took the lead, causing his horse to rear and throw him against the iron fence. Marchbanks fractured his knee.
Essendon player Jim Martin received a 12-match suspension for striking Fitzroy player George Holden (see also ) during the round 8 match, despite there being no witnesses who saw Martin throw a punch; it appeared that Holden had thrown himself at Martin, who was stationary and braced himself for the collision. Martin was charged with assault, and was found not guilty on appeal when the case went to the District Court, but the tribunal's suspension cost him a place in Essendon's premiership team.
From Round 15, St Kilda players went on strike to protest the club committee's barring of former player and captain Joe Hogan and the father of star player Wels Eicke from the club, and the Saints had to use 62 players for the season, the most by any team in the history of the VFL/AFL; due to a series of long-running disputes with the committee, St. Kilda also used 55 players in 1909 and 60 players in 1910. After the strike, the club lost its last four games by an average of 96 points.
 In Round 15, Vin Gardiner of Carlton became only the second player to kick ten goals in a match; his 21 scoring shots (10.11) also set a new record for a single player in a game.
 In Round 16, Essendon scored 24.19 (163) against the strike-affected , setting a new record for the highest score in a VFL match and breaking the previous record of 23.24 (162) set by Geelong in 1899.
 In the 1911 finals series, players wore numbers on their backs for the first time in any VFL match played in Melbourne.

References
 Atkinson, G. (1982) Everything you ever wanted to know about Australian rules football but couldn't be bothered asking, The Five Mile Press: Melbourne. .
 Rogers, S. & Brown, A., Every Game Ever Played: VFL/AFL Results 1897–1997 (Sixth Edition)'', Viking Books, (Ringwood), 1998.

External links
 1911 Season – AFL Tables
 Player payments and the great bribery scandal

Australian Football League seasons
VFL season